N. Mandal (Naresh Mandal born 13 April 1986) is an Indian director, editor, and producer in the Indian Film & Television industry. known for Lok Astha Ke Mahaparv Chhath (2018), Dark Night (2019) and Mukti Abhishap Se
(2019). Founder and Director of sincine film Festival.
He runs a Productions company, Shivaay Productions Pvt. Ltd. He also owns the Anand films production house.

Filmography

References

नरेश मंडल के निर्देशन में फिल्म 2 December 2018

External links
N. Mandal  on Facebook
N. Mandal  on Instagram
N. Mandal  on Twitter 

Hindi film editors
Film editors from Bihar
Film directors from Bihar
Year of birth missing (living people)
Living people
People from Bihar
Film directors from Mumbai
Indian documentary filmmakers
Hindi-language film directors
Film producers from Mumbai
Indian male screenwriters
Film producers from Bihar
People from Samastipur district
Hindi film producers